Hyer Branch is a stream in Dent and Phelps counties in the Ozarks of Missouri. It is a tributary to the Dry Fork of the Meramec River.

Hyer Branch or Hyer Valley Branch derives its name from John Hyer, a pioneer citizen.

See also
List of rivers of Missouri

References

Rivers of Dent County, Missouri
Rivers of Phelps County, Missouri
Rivers of Missouri
Tributaries of the Meramec River